Malaxis macrostachya  is a species of orchid widespread across much Mexico, Central America, and the southwestern United States (Arizona, New Mexico, western Texas). It has only one leaf per plant, along with a tall flower stalk with as many as 160 tiny, green flowers.

References

External links
photo of herbarium specimen at Missouri Botanical Garden, collected in Oaxaca in 1996

Flora of the Southwestern United States
Orchids of Central America
Orchids of Mexico
Plants described in 1891
macrostachya